Nuevo Palmar Sur Airport  is an airport serving the hamlets of Finca (farm) 10 and Finca 5 in Puntarenas Province, Costa Rica. There is distant mountainous terrain to the north.

See also

 Transport in Costa Rica
 List of airports in Costa Rica

References

External links
 OurAirports - Nuevo Palmar Sur
 OpenStreetMap - Nuevo Palmar Sur
 HERE Maps - Nuevo Palmar Sur
 FallingRain - Nuevo Palmar Sur Airport

Airports in Costa Rica
Puntarenas Province